Our America with Lisa Ling is an American documentary television series that aired on the Oprah Winfrey Network for five seasons from February 15, 2011 until July 31, 2014. Hosted by journalist Lisa Ling, each episode examines an aspect of American society that may be viewed as marginal or outside the mainstream.

Episodes

Season 1 (2011)
Season 1 of Our America with Lisa Ling aired on Oprah Winfrey Network from Tuesday February 15, 2011 until Tuesday March 29, 2011. The first season was broadcast weekly on Tuesday nights at 10/9c.

Season 2 (2011)
Season 2 of Our America with Lisa Ling aired on the Oprah Winfrey Network from Sunday October 16, 2011 until Sunday December 4, 2011. The second season was broadcast weekly on Sunday nights at 10/9c.

Season 3 (2012)
Season 3 of Our America with Lisa Ling aired on the Oprah Winfrey Network from Sunday June 10, 2012 until Tuesday August 21, 2012. The third season was broadcast weekly on Tuesday nights at 10/9c.

Season 4 (2013)
Season 4 of Our America with Lisa Ling aired on the Oprah Winfrey Network from Tuesday January 22, 2013 until Tuesday March 12, 2013. The fourth season was broadcast weekly on Tuesday nights at 10/9c.

Season 5 (2014)
The fifth and final season of Our America with Lisa Ling premiered on OWN on May 29, 2014.

Critical response
Hank Stuever of The Washington Post praised the series, calling it "an intelligent, ruminative affirmation on the ways life might resemble a daytime talk show". Ling is called empathetic and sensitive and the series a throwback to "the quality TV magazine journalism that predated the infotainment glut". However he finds that while Ling is emotionally affected by the stories she finds she seems "none the wiser" for having found them.

Ratings
The debut episode of Our America drew an average of 574,000 viewers. This was an improvement over the average viewership that the network attracted during its first week on the air and an improvement of 242% over its predecessor, Discovery Health Channel, from a year earlier.

In its second season, Our America continued with strong ratings, ranking #17 in its time period among 95 ad-supported cable networks. The show posted triple digit growth for the month of October across the key demos versus year ago numbers (+189% W25-54, +108% HH, +126% P2+, compared with Discovery Health's ratings in October 2010).

External links

References

2011 American television series debuts
2014 American television series endings
2010s American documentary television series
English-language television shows
Oprah Winfrey Network original programming